Dasol Lee (born January 4, 1990) is a Korean-Canadian beauty pageant titleholder who was crowned Miss Grand Korea 2015. She represented Korea in the Miss Grand International 2015 pageant held in Bangkok, Thailand.

Personal life
Lee was born in Cheongju, South Korea and grew up in Seoul. Her family moved to Canada when she was nine years old. She grew up in Hamilton, Ontario.
She studied Bachelor of Science in Chemistry at Queen's University and Bachelor of Education at University of Toronto.
She has played piano and violin for over 20 years. She speaks Korean, English, and French.

Pageantry

Miss Grand International 2015
Dasol Lee represented her country, Korea in Miss Grand International pageant held in Bangkok, Thailand.

Miss Universe Canada 2014
Dasol Lee competed in Miss Universe Canada 2014, held in Toronto, Ontario, Canada.

References

1990 births
Living people
South Korean emigrants to Canada
South Korean beauty pageant winners